Barry Ted Moskowitz (born August 17, 1950) is a senior United States district judge of the United States District Court for the Southern District of California.

Education and career

Born in Paterson, New Jersey, Moskowitz received a Bachelor of Arts degree from Rutgers College in 1972 and a Juris Doctor from Rutgers School of Law–Newark in 1975. He was a law clerk for Judge Leonard I. Garth on the United States Court of Appeals for the Third Circuit from 1975 to 1976. He was an Assistant United States Attorney for the District of New Jersey from 1976 to 1982. He was in private practice in Wayne, New Jersey from 1982 to 1985, and was then again an Assistant United States Attorney, this time in the Southern District of California, from 1985 to 1988.

Federal judicial service

From 1986 to 1995, Moskowitz was a United States magistrate judge of the Southern District of California. On June 30, 1995, Moskowitz was nominated by President Bill Clinton to a new seat on the United States District Court for the Southern District of California created by 104 Stat. 5089. He was confirmed by the United States Senate on December 22, 1995, and received his commission on December 26, 1995. He was elevated to chief judge on January 23, 2012  He assumed senior status on January 23, 2019.

See also
List of Jewish American jurists

References

Sources

1950 births
Living people
Assistant United States Attorneys
Judges of the United States District Court for the Southern District of California
People from Paterson, New Jersey
Rutgers School of Law–Newark alumni
Rutgers University alumni
United States district court judges appointed by Bill Clinton
United States magistrate judges
20th-century American judges
21st-century American judges